Bourne was a rural district in Lincolnshire, Parts of Kesteven from 1894 to 1931.

It was created by the Local Government Act 1894 based on the Bourne rural sanitary district.  In 1931, under a County Review Order, it was abolished, with its area going to form part of the new South Kesteven Rural District.

References
https://web.archive.org/web/20071001011633/http://www.visionofbritain.org.uk/relationships.jsp?u_id=10216606&c_id=10001043

Rural districts of Kesteven
Districts of England created by the Local Government Act 1894